Fort Buckner is a United States Army base located immediately south of Camp Foster, near Futenma, on Okinawa, Japan.  The 78th Signal Battalion and E Co. of the 53d Signal Battalion (SATCON) are the only units on this small installation.  All local Army-specific support for the unit is located on Torii Station, but due to the joint force nature of United States military operations on Okinawa, many ancillary services for Fort Buckner units are located on Camp Foster and Kadena Air Base.  Fort Buckner was named in honor of Lieutenant General Simon Bolivar Buckner, Jr., who was killed in action while commanding the Tenth Army during the Battle of Okinawa during World War II.

External links 
 Rising Sun: U.S. Army Garrison Japan Official Site

Installations of the United States Army in Japan
United States Armed Forces in Okinawa Prefecture